Bouchercon is an annual convention of creators and devotees of mystery and detective fiction. It is named in honour of writer, reviewer, and editor Anthony Boucher; also the inspiration for the Anthony Awards, which have been issued at the convention since 1986. This page details Bouchercon XIX and the 3rd Anthony Awards ceremony.

Bouchercon
The convention was held in San Diego, California on October 7, 1988; running until the 9th. The event was chaired by Phyllis Brown, of local mystery bookshop "Grounds For Murder", and Ray Hardy.

Special Guests
Guest of Honor — Charlotte MacLeod
Fan Guest of Honor — Bruce Taylor
Toastmaster — Robert Barnard

Anthony Awards
The following list details the awards distributed at the third annual Anthony Awards ceremony.

Novel award
Winner:
Tony Hillerman, Skinwalkers

Shortlist:
Linda Barnes, A Trouble of Fools
Aaron Elkins, Old Bones
Elizabeth Peters, Trojan Gold
Nancy Pickard, Marriage is Murder

First novel award
Winner:
Gillian Roberts, Caught Dead in Philadelphia

Shortlist:
Michael Allegretto, Death on the Rocks
Robert J. Bowman, The House of Blue Lights
Mary Monica Pulver, Murder at the War: A Modern-Day Mystery With a Medieval Setting
Les Roberts, An Infinite Number of Monkeys

Paperback original award
Winner:
Robert Crais, The Monkey's Raincoat

Shortlist:
Lilian Jackson Braun, The Cat Who Played Brahms
Carolyn G. Hart, Death on Demand
Conrad Haynes, Bishop's Gambit, Declined
Lia Matera, Where Lawyers Fear to Tread
Sharyn McCrumb, Bimbos of the Death Sun

Short story award
Winner:
Robert Barnard, "Breakfast Television", from Ellery Queen's Mystery Magazine January 1987

Shortlist:
Max Allan Collins, "Scrap", from The Black Lizard Anthology of Crime Fiction
Harlan Ellison, "Soft Monkey", from Mystery Scene Reader: A Special Tribute to John D. MacDonald
Ed Gorman, "Turn Away", from The Black Lizard Anthology of Crime Fiction
Joyce Harrington, "The Au Pair Girl", from A Matter Of Crime

Movie award
Winner:
The Big Easy

Shortlist:
Black Widow
Fatal Attraction
No Way Out
RoboCop
Stakeout

Television series award
Winner:
Mystery!

Shortlist:
The Equalizer
Murder She Wrote
Private Eye
Wiseguy

References

Anthony Awards
19
1988 in California